By FIFA's latest count in 2006, Ecuador is home to 201 football clubs (175 are listed below). Clubs are not only members of the Federación Ecuatoriana de Fútbol, Ecuador's football governing body, but of one of 18 provincial football associations in the country. Clubs play in either Primera Categoría (divided into Serie A or Serie B) or Segunda Categoría.

Primera Categoría
The Primera Categoría is divided into the top-flight Serie A and the second-level Serie B. Each division has twelve clubs. The following are the 16 clubs in the Primera Categoría for the 2021 season.

Serie A

Barcelona SC
Emelec
Liga de Quito
Independiente del Valle
Deportivo Cuenca
Delfín SC
Universidad Católica
9 de Octubre FC
CD Macará
Técnico Universitario
Aucas
Mushuc Runa
Guayaquil City 
Orense
Cumbayá FC
Gualaceo SC

Serie B
El Nacional
Manta FC
Olmedo
Libertad FC
Imbabura SC
Chacaritas
América de Quito
Independiente Juniors
Buhos ULVR
Atlético Santo Domingo

By provincial association
There are twenty-one provincial football associations affiliated with the Ecuadorian Football Federation, each with a number of affiliated clubs.

Azuay
There are seven clubs affiliated with the Professional Football Association of Azuay. Home city in parentheses.
Deportivo Cuenca (Cuenca)
El Cuartel (Cuenca)
Estudiantes (Cuenca)
Gualaceo (Gualaceo)
Gloria  (Cuenca)
LDU Cuenca (Cuenca)
Tecni Club (Cuenca)

Bolívar
There are five clubs affiliated with the Professional Football Association of Bolívar. Home city in parentheses.
Gremio (Echeandía)
Huracán (Guaranda)
Juvenil Minera (Las Naves)
Primero de Mayo (Guaranda)
Unibolivar (Guaranda)

Cañar
There are six clubs affiliated with the Professional Football Association of Cañar. Home city in parentheses.
Deportistas Amigos (La Troncal)
Deportivo Azogues (Azogues)
Deportivo Troncal (La Troncal)
Manuel J. Calle (La Troncal)
Municipal Cañar (Cañar)
Uniban (La Troncal)

Chimborazo
There are seven clubs affiliated with the Non-Amateur Football Association of Chimborazo. Home city in parentheses.
Atlético de Riobamba (Riobamba)
Atlético San Pedro (Riobamba)
Atlético Universitario (Riobamba)
Corazao Riombamba (Riobamba)
Deportivo Chimborazo (Riobamba)
Olmedo (Riobamba)
Star Club (Riobamba)

Cotopaxi
There are four clubs affiliated with the Non-Amateur Football Association of Cotopaxi. Home city in parentheses.
Deportivo Saquisilí (Saquisilí)
LDE (Latacunga)
Ramón Barba Naranjo (Latacunga)
UT Cotopaxi (Latacunga)

El Oro
There are fifteen clubs affiliated with the Professional Football Association of El Oro. Home city in parentheses.
Atlético Audaz (Machala)
Audaz Octubrino (Machala)
Bolívar (Machala)
Comercial Huaquillas (Huaquillas)
Condor (Arenillas)
Fuerza Amarilla (Machala)
Huaquillas (Huaquillas)
Junin (Machala)
Kléber Franco Cruz (Machala)
Oro (Machala)
Parma (Machala)
Río Amarillo (Portovelo)
Santa Rosa (Santa Rosa)
Santos (El Guabo)
Urseza (Machala)

Esmeraldas
There are eleven clubs affiliated with the Non-Amateur Football Association of Esmeraldas. Home city in parentheses.
Atacames (Atacames)
Atletico Valencia (Atacames)
Cinco de Agosto (Esmeraldas)
Esmeraldas (Esmeraldas)
Juvenil (Quinindé)
Juvenil de Esmeraldas (Esmeraldas)
Juventus (Esmeraldas)
Rocafuerte (Esmeraldas)
Sagrado Corazón (Esmeraldas)
Tácito Ortiz Urriola (Esmeraldas)
Vargas Torres (Esmeraldas)

Guayas
Barcelona Sporting Club - Guayaquil - (Serie A)
Club Sport Emelec - Guayaquil (Serie A)
Guayaquil City Fútbol Club - Guayaquil - (Serie A)
9 de Octubre FC - Guayaquil - (Serie A)
Guayaquil Sport Club - Guayaquil - (Serie B)
Club Sport Patria - Samborondón - (Segunda Categoría)
Asociación Deportiva Naval (Guayaquil)
Calvi Fútbol Club (Guayaquil)
Club Deportivo Everest (Guayaquil)
Club Deportivo Filanbanco (Guayaquil)
Club Social Cultural y Deportivo Don Café (Guayaquil)
Club Deportivo Espol (Guayaquil)
Club Social Estudiantes del Guayas (Guayaquil)
Club Social y Deportivo Paladin"S" (Guayaquil)
Club Social, Cultural y Deportivo "FEDEGUAYAS" (Guayaquil)
Club Sport Atlético Daule (Daule)
Liga Deportiva Estudiantil (Guayaquil)
Liga Deportiva Universitaria de Guayaquil (Guayaquil)
Panamá Sporting Club (Guayaquil)
Toreros Futbol Club (Guayaquil)
Club Atlético Samborondón (Samborondón)
Rocafuerte Fútbol Club (Guayaquil)
Guayaquil Futbol Club (Guayaquil)
Legión Amarilla Futbol Club (Guayaquil)
Club Atlético Giancarlo Ramos (Guayaquil)

Imbabura
Centro Deportivo 31 de Octubre (Otavalo)
Club Deportivo Otavalo (Otavalo)
Club Valle del Chota (Chota)
Imbabura Sporting Club (Ibarra)
Teodoro Gómez De La Torre Fútbol Club (Ibarra)

Loja
Club Búfalos (Loja)
Club Alianza de Puyango (Puyango)
Club Deportivo Boca Juniors (Saraguro)
Club Deportivo Nuevos Horizontes (Loja)
JVC Fútbol Club (Loja)
Liga Deportiva Universitaria de Loja (Loja)
Universidad Técnica de Loja (Loja)

Los Ríos
Club Deportivo Venecia (Babahoyo)
Club Social y Deportivo Mocache (Mocache)
Club Social, Cultural y Deportivo El Guayacán (Quevedo)
Club Social, Cultural y Deportivo Patria (Buena Fé)
Club Social, Cultural y Deportivo San Camilo (Quevedo)
Club Social, Cultural y Deportivo Pibes en Acción  (Quevedo)
Corinthians Fútbol Club (Quevedo)
Fiorentina Fútbol Club (Quevedo)
Liga Deportiva Universitaria de Quevedo (Quevedo)
River Fútbol Club (Quevedo)
Segundo Hoyos Jácome (Valencia)

Manabí
Calceta Sporting Club (Calceta)
Club Atlético Green Cross (Tosagua)
Club Atlético River Plate (Portoviejo)
Club Cristo Rey (Portoviejo)
Club Peñarol (Portoviejo)
Club Social Cultural y Deportivo Palmeiras (Portoviejo)
Club Social y Deportivo del Valle (Portoviejo)
Club Social Deportivo Melmoni (Manta)
Club Social y Deportivo Bahía de Caraquez (Bahía de Caraquez)
Club Social y Deportivo Ciudad de Pedernales (Pedernales)
Club Social, Cultural y Deportivo Colón (Portoviejo)
Club Social, Cultural y Deportivo Grecia (Chone)
Club Social, Cultural y Deportivo Halley (Jipijapa)
Club Social, Cultural y Deportivo Magali Masson (Chone)
Club Social, Cultural y Deportivo Universitario (Portoviejo)
Club Universitario Cañita Sport (Portoviejo)
Delfín Sporting Club (Manta)
Juventud Italiana  (Manta)
Liga Deportiva Universitaria de Portoviejo (Portoviejo)
Manta Fútbol Club (Manta)
Politécnico Manabí  (Calceta)
Green Cross (Manta)

Morona-Santiago
Club Social y Deportivo Apecru (Sucua)
Club Social y Deportivo Liga Deportiva Juvenil (Macas)
Club Social y Deportivo Macas (Macas)
Club Social y Deportivo Morona (Macas)
Club Social y Deportivo Oriente (Macas)
Club Social y Deportivo Sucua (Sucua)

Pastaza
Club Cumanda (Puyo)
Club Deportivo Puyo (Puyo)
Club Técnico Shell (Shell)
Pastaza Moto Club (Puyo)

Pichincha
There are sixteen clubs affiliated with the Non-Amateur Football Association of Pichincha. Home city in parentheses.
América (Quito)
Brasilia (Sangolquí)
Chacarita (Quito)
Chile (Uyumbicho)
Cuniburo (Cayambe)
Cumbayá (Cumbayá)
Deportivo Quito (Quito)
El Nacional (Quito)
ESPOLI (Cayambe)
Independiente José Terán (Sangolquí)
JUPS (Cayambe)
Real Sociedad (Quito)
Turín (Quito)
Universidad Católica (Quito)
Universidad San Francisco de Quito (Quito)
UT Equinoccial (Santo Domingo)

Santo Domingo de Los Tsáchilas
Club Social y Deportivo Apecru (Sucua)
Club Social Deportivo Talleres (Santo Domingo de los Colorados)
Club Sociedad Deportiva Municipal (Santo Domingo de los Colorados)
Club Sport Santo Domingo (Santo Domingo de los Colorados)
Club Cultural y Deportivo Aguilas (Santo Domingo de los Colorados)

Sucumbios
Club Deportivo Che Faraón (Nueva Loja)
Club Deportivo Chicos Malos (Nueva Loja)
Club Deportivo Consejo Provincial (Nueva Loja)
Club Deportivo Oriental (Shushufindi)
Club Deportivo Caribe Junior (Nueva Loja)
Club Social Cultural y Deportivo Racing Junior (Nueva Loja)

Tungurahua
América Sporting Club (Ambato)
Bolívar Club Deportivo (Ambato)
Club Deportivo Cevallos (Cevallos)
Club Deportivo Técnico Universitario (Ambato)
Club Social y Deportivo Brasil (Ambato)
Club Social y Deportivo El Globo (Ambato)
Club Social y Deportivo Macará (Ambato)
Pelileo Sporting Club (Pelileo)
Técnico Guayaquil (Ambato)
Tungurahua Sporting Club (Ambato)

Orellana 
Anaconda

Santa Elena 
 Atlético Porteño - Salinas / Guayaquil - Serie B
 Sport Bilbao - Salinas
 Santa Elena S.C. - Santa Elena Canton

Zamora Chinchipe

References

See also
Ecuadorian Football Federation
Ecuadorian football league system
Serie A
Serie B

Ecuador
Football clubs
 
Football clubs